The 2019–20 season was Newport County's seventh consecutive season in Football League Two, after missing out on promotion at the 2019 EFL League Two play-off Final. It was Newport's 67th season in the Football League and 99th season of league football overall. The 2019–20 season was suspended on 13 March 2019 due to the Coronavirus pandemic with Newport 15th in League Two. The League Two season was formally terminated on 9 June 2020 with Newport having ten league matches unplayed. Points per game was subsequently adopted to determine the final League Two table with Newport County rising one place to 14th in the league.

Transfers

Transfers in

Loans in

Loans out

Transfers out

Pre-season
On 24 June 2019, Newport announced their pre-season schedule. A XI friendly against Moreton Rangers was later confirmed. The Exiles also travelled to Spain for a week training camp where they faced Egyptian side Al Ahly.

Competitions

League Two

League table

Result summary

Results by matchday

Fixtures
On Thursday, 20 June 2019, the EFL League Two fixtures were announced.

FA Cup

The first round draw was made on 21 October 2019. The second round draw was made live on 11 November from Chichester City's stadium, Oaklands Park. The third round draw was made live on BBC Two from Etihad Stadium, Micah Richards and Tony Adams conducted the draw.

EFL Cup

The first round draw was made on 20 June. The second round draw was made on 13 August 2019 following the conclusion of all but one first round matches.

EFL Trophy

On 9 July 2019, the pre-determined group stage draw was announced with Invited clubs to be drawn on 12 July 2019. The draw for the second round was made on 16 November 2019 live on Sky Sports. The third round draw was confirmed on 5 December 2019.

Squad statistics
Source:

|-
!colspan=14|Players currently out on loan:

|-
!colspan=14|Players who left the club:

|}

Goals record

Disciplinary record

References

2019–20
Welsh football clubs 2019–20 season
2019–20 EFL League Two by team